The 1994–95 Cymru Alliance was the fifth season of the Cymru Alliance after its establishment in 1990. The league was won by Cemaes Bay.

League table

External links
Cymru Alliance

Cymru Alliance seasons
2
Wales